The Appalachian Mountains, often called the Appalachians, are a system of mountains in eastern to northeastern North America. The Appalachians first formed roughly 480 million years ago during the Ordovician Period. They once reached elevations similar to those of the Alps and the Rocky Mountains before experiencing natural erosion. The Appalachian chain is a barrier to east–west travel, as it forms a series of alternating ridgelines and valleys oriented in opposition to most highways and railroads running east–west.

Definitions vary on the precise boundaries of the Appalachians. The U.S. Geological Survey (USGS) defines the Appalachian Highlands  physiographic division as consisting of 13 provinces: the Atlantic Coast Uplands, Eastern Newfoundland Atlantic, Maritime Acadian Highlands, Maritime Plain, Notre Dame and Mégantic Mountains, Western Newfoundland Mountains, Piedmont, Blue Ridge, Valley and Ridge, St. Lawrence Valley, Appalachian Plateaus, and New England province.<ref
 name="USGS-Water">
</ref> The Appalachians do not include the Adirondack Mountains, a distinct and growing range that is a part of the Canadian Shield and belongs to the Grenville Orogeny.<ref
 name=peakbag>
</ref><ref
 name=weidensaul>
</ref>

Overview
The range covers parts of the islands of Saint Pierre and Miquelon, an overseas territory of France.

The term Appalachian refers to several different regions associated with the mountain range. Most broadly, it refers to the entire mountain range with its surrounding hills and the dissected plateau region. The term is often used more restrictively to refer to regions in the central and southern Appalachian Mountains, usually including areas in the states of Kentucky, Tennessee, Virginia, Maryland, West Virginia, and North Carolina, and sometimes extending as far south as northern Alabama, Georgia, and western South Carolina, and as far north as Pennsylvania, southern and east central Ohio, Lower New York and the Southern Tier region of New York.

The Ouachita Mountains in Arkansas and Oklahoma were originally part of the Appalachians as well but became disconnected through geologic history.

Origin of the name

While exploring inland along the northern coast of Florida in 1528, the members of the Narváez expedition, including Álvar Núñez Cabeza de Vaca, found a Native American village near present-day Tallahassee, Florida whose name they transcribed as Apalchen or Apalachen . The name was soon altered by the Spanish to Apalachee and used as a name for the tribe and region spreading well inland to the north. Pánfilo de Narváez's expedition first entered Apalachee territory on June 15, 1528, and applied the name. Now spelled "Appalachian," it is the fourth-oldest surviving European place-name in the US.

After the 1540 expedition of Hernando de Soto, Spanish cartographers began to apply the name of the tribe to the mountains themselves. The first cartographic appearance of Apalchen is on Diego Gutiérrez's map of 1562; the first use for the mountain range is the map of Jacques le Moyne de Morgues in 1565.

The name was not commonly used for the whole mountain range until the late 19th century. A competing and often more popular name was the "Allegheny Mountains", "Alleghenies", and even "Alleghania". In the early 19th century, Washington Irving proposed renaming the United States either Appalachia or Alleghania.

In U.S. dialects in the southern regions of the Appalachians, the word is pronounced , with the third syllable sounding like "latch". There is often great debate between the residents of the regions as to which pronunciation is the more correct one.

Geography

Regions
The Appalachian Mountains include three major sections:

 Northern: The northern section runs from the Canadian province of Newfoundland and Labrador to the Hudson River. The Metacomet Ridge Mountains in Connecticut and south-central Massachusetts, although contained within the Appalachian province, is a younger system and not geologically associated with the Appalachians. The Monteregian Hills, which cross the Green Mountains in Quebec, are also unassociated with the Appalachians. The Adirondack Mountains in New York are sometimes included with maps of the Appalachian chain but are in fact a southern extension of the Laurentian Mountains of Canada.

 Central: The central section runs from the Hudson Valley in New York to the New River through the Lehigh Valley and central Pennsylvania and western Maryland to western Virginia and West Virginia. The central region comprises the Valley Ridges between the Allegheny Front of the Allegheny Plateau and the Great Appalachian Valley, the New York–New Jersey Highlands, the Taconic Mountains in New York, and a large portion of the Blue Ridge. In addition to the true folded mountains, known as the ridge and valley province, the area of dissected plateau to the north and west of the mountains is usually grouped with the Appalachians. This includes the Catskill Mountains of Lower New York, the Poconos in Pennsylvania, and the Allegheny Plateau of New York's Southern Tier region, western Pennsylvania, eastern Ohio and northern West Virginia.

 Southern: The southern section runs from the New River and consists of the prolongation of the Blue Ridge Mountains, which is divided into the Western Blue Ridge (or Unaka) Front and the Eastern Blue Ridge Front, the Ridge-and-Valley Appalachians, and the Cumberland Plateau. This same plateau is known as the Cumberland Plateau in southern West Virginia, eastern Kentucky, western Virginia, eastern Tennessee, and northern Alabama.

The dissected plateau area, while not actually made up of geological mountains, is popularly called "mountains," especially in eastern Kentucky and West Virginia, and while the ridges are not high, the terrain is extremely rugged. In Ohio and New York, some of the plateau has been glaciated, which has rounded off the sharp ridges and filled the valleys to some extent. The glaciated regions are usually referred to as hill country rather than mountains.

The Appalachian region is generally considered the geographical divide between the eastern seaboard of the United States and the Midwest region of the country. The Eastern Continental Divide follows the Appalachian Mountains from Pennsylvania to Georgia.

The Appalachian Trail is a  hiking trail that runs all the way from Mount Katahdin in Maine to Springer Mountain in Georgia, passing over or past a large part of the Appalachian system. The International Appalachian Trail is an extension of this hiking trail into the Canadian portion of the Appalachian range in New Brunswick and Quebec.

Chief summits

The Appalachian belt includes, with the ranges enumerated above, the plateaus sloping southward to the Atlantic Ocean in New England, and south-eastward to the border of the coastal plain through the central and southern Atlantic states; and on the north-west, the Allegheny and Cumberland plateaus declining toward the Great Lakes and the interior plains. A remarkable feature of the belt is the longitudinal chain of broad valleys, including the Great Appalachian Valley, which in the southerly sections divides the mountain system into two unequal portions, but in the northernmost lies west of all the ranges possessing typical Appalachian features, and separates them from the Adirondack group. The mountain system has no axis of dominating altitudes, but in every portion, the summits rise to rather uniform heights, and, especially in the central section, the various ridges and intermontane valleys have the same trend as the system itself. None of the summits reaches the region of perpetual snow.

In the Chic-Choc and Notre Dame mountain ranges in Quebec, the higher summits rise above  in elevation.

In Maryland, Eagle Rock and Dans Mountain are conspicuous points reaching  and  respectively. On the same side of the Great Valley, south of the Potomac, are the Pinnacle  and Pidgeon Roost . In West Virginia, more than 150 peaks rise above , including Spruce Knob , the highest point in the Allegheny Mountains. A number of other points in the state rise above . Cheat Mountain (Snowshoe Mountain) at Thorny Flat  and Bald Knob  are among the more notable peaks in West Virginia.

South Mountain achieves its highest point just below the Mason-Dixon line in Maryland at Quirauk Mountain  and then diminishes in height southward to the Potomac River. Once in Virginia, the Blue Ridge again reaches  and higher. In the Virginia Blue Ridge, the following are some of the highest peaks north of the Roanoke River: Stony Man , Hawksbill Mountain , Apple Orchard Mountain  and Peaks of Otter . South of the Roanoke River, along the Blue Ridge, are Virginia's highest peaks including Whitetop Mountain  and Mount Rogers , the highest point in the Commonwealth.

Chief summits in the southern section of the Blue Ridge are located along two main crests—the Western or Unaka Front along the Tennessee-North Carolina border and the Eastern Front in North Carolina—or one of several "cross ridges" between the two main crests. Major subranges of the Eastern Front include the Black Mountains, Great Craggy Mountains, and Great Balsam Mountains, and its chief summits include Grandfather Mountain  near the Tennessee-North Carolina border, Mount Mitchell  in the Blacks, and Black Balsam Knob  and Cold Mountain  in the Great Balsams. The Western Blue Ridge Front is subdivided into the Unaka Range, the Bald Mountains, the Great Smoky Mountains, and the Unicoi Mountains, and its major peaks include Roan Mountain  in the Unakas, Big Bald  and Max Patch  in the Bald Mountains, Clingmans Dome , Mount Le Conte , and Mount Guyot  in the Great Smokies, and Big Frog Mountain  near the Tennessee-Georgia-North Carolina border. Prominent summits in the cross ridges include Waterrock Knob in the Plott Balsams.

Drainage

There are many geological issues concerning the rivers and streams of the Appalachians. In spite of the existence of the Great Appalachian Valley, many of the main rivers are transverse to the mountain system axis. The drainage divide of the Appalachians follows a tortuous course that crosses the mountainous belt just north of the New River in Virginia. South of the New River, rivers head into the Blue Ridge, cross the higher Unakas, receive important tributaries from the Great Valley, and traversing the Cumberland Plateau in spreading gorges (water gaps), escape by way of the Cumberland River and the Tennessee River rivers to the Ohio River and the Mississippi River, and thence to the Gulf of Mexico. In the central section, north of the New River, the rivers, rising in or just beyond the Valley Ridges, flow through great gorges to the Great Valley, and then across the Blue Ridge to tidal estuaries penetrating the coastal plain via the Roanoke River, James River, Potomac River, and Susquehanna River.

In the northern section the height of land lies on the inland side of the mountainous belt, and thus the main lines of drainage run from north to south, exemplified by the Hudson River. However, the valley through which the Hudson River flows was cut by the gigantic glaciers of the ice ages—the same glaciers that deposited their terminal moraines in southern New York and formed the east–west Long Island.

Geology

A look at rocks that are exposed in today's Appalachian mountains reveals elongated belts of folded and thrust faulted marine sedimentary rocks, volcanic rocks and slivers of ancient ocean floor, which provides strong evidence that these rocks were deformed during plate collision. The birth of the Appalachian ranges, some 480 million years ago, marks the first of several mountain-building plate collisions that culminated in the construction of the supercontinent Pangaea with the Appalachians near the center. Because North America and Africa were connected, the Appalachians formed part of the same mountain chain as the Little Atlas in Morocco. This mountain range, known as the Central Pangean Mountains, extended into Scotland, before the Mesozoic Era opening of the Iapetus Ocean, from the North America/Europe collision (See Caledonian orogeny).

During the middle Ordovician Period (about 496–440 million years ago), a change in plate motions set the stage for the first Paleozoic mountain-building event (Taconic orogeny) in North America. The once-quiet Appalachian passive margin changed to a very active plate boundary when a neighboring oceanic plate, the Iapetus, collided with and began sinking beneath the North American craton. With the birth of this new subduction zone, the early Appalachians were born. Volcanoes grew along the continental margin coincident with the initiation of subduction. Thrust faulting uplifted and warped older sedimentary rock laid down on the passive margin. As the mountains rose, erosion began to wear them down over time. Streams carried rock debris downslope to be deposited in nearby lowlands. The Taconic Orogeny was just the first of a series of mountain building plate collisions that contributed to the formation of the Appalachians, culminating in the collision of North America and Africa (see Alleghanian orogeny).

By the end of the Mesozoic Era, the Appalachian Mountains had been eroded to an almost flat plain. It was not until the region was uplifted during the Cenozoic Era that the distinctive topography of the present formed. Uplift rejuvenated the streams, which rapidly responded by cutting downward into the ancient bedrock. Some streams flowed along weak layers that define the folds and faults created many millions of years earlier. Other streams downcut so rapidly that they cut right across the resistant folded rocks of the mountain core, carving canyons across rock layers and geologic structures.

Mineral resources
The Appalachian Mountains contain major deposits of anthracite coal as well as bituminous coal. In the folded mountains the coal is in metamorphosed form as anthracite, represented by the Coal Region of northeastern Pennsylvania. The bituminous coal fields of western Pennsylvania, western Maryland, southeastern Ohio, eastern Kentucky, southwestern Virginia, and West Virginia contain the sedimentary form of coal. The mountain top removal method of coal mining, in which entire mountain tops are removed, is currently threatening vast areas and ecosystems of the Appalachian Mountain region. The surface coal mining that started in the 1940s has significantly impacted the central Appalachian Mountains in Kentucky, Tennessee, Virginia and West Virginia. Early mining methods were unregulated and mined land reclamation research, including acid base reaction, was led by the West Virginia University in the 1960s and 1970s. West Virginia developed rigorous mine reclamation standards for state coal mines in the late 1960s. Regulations were introduced by most federal states to protect the Appalachian Mountains by the late 1960s. Social and political activism brought about the Surface Mining Control and Reclamation Act of 1977.

The 1859 discovery of commercial quantities of petroleum in the Appalachian Mountains of western Pennsylvania started the modern United States petroleum industry. Recent discoveries of commercial natural gas deposits in the Marcellus Shale formation and Utica Shale formations have once again focused oil industry attention on the Appalachian Basin.

Some plateaus of the Appalachian Mountains contain metallic minerals such as iron and zinc.

Ecology
The Appalachians, particularly the Central and Southern regions, is one of the most biodiverse places in North America. The north–south orientation of the long ridges and valleys contributes to the high number of plant and animal species. Species were able to migrate through these from either direction during alternating periods of warming and cooling, settling in the microclimates that best suited them.

Flora

The flora of the Appalachians are diverse and vary primarily in response to geology, latitude, elevation and moisture availability. Geobotanically, they constitute a floristic province of the North American Atlantic Region. The Appalachians consist primarily of deciduous broad-leaf trees and evergreen needle-leaf conifers, but also contain the evergreen broad-leaf American holly, and the deciduous needle-leaf conifer, the tamarack, or eastern larch.

It also grows southward along the Appalachian crest to the highest elevations of the southern Appalachians, as in North Carolina and Tennessee. In the central Appalachians it is usually confined above  asl, except for a few cold valleys in which it reaches lower elevations. In the southern Appalachians, it is restricted to higher elevations. Another species is the black spruce, which extends farthest north of any conifer in North America, is found at high elevations in the northern Appalachians, and in bogs as far south as Pennsylvania.

The Appalachians are also home to two species of fir, the boreal balsam fir, and the southern high elevation endemic, Fraser fir. Fraser fir is confined to the highest parts of the southern Appalachian Mountains, where along with red spruce it forms a fragile ecosystem known as the Southern Appalachian spruce–fir forest. By contrast, balsam fir is found from near sea level to the tree line in the northern Appalachians, but ranges only as far south as Virginia and West Virginia in the central Appalachians, where it is usually confined above  asl, except in cold valleys. Curiously, it is associated with oaks in Virginia. The balsam fir of Virginia and West Virginia is thought by some to be a natural hybrid between the more northern variety and Fraser fir. While red spruce is common in both upland and bog habitats, balsam fir, as well as black spruce and tamarack, are more characteristic of the latter. However, balsam fir also does well in soils with a pH as high as 6.

Eastern or Canada hemlock is another important evergreen needle-leaf conifer that grows along the Appalachian chain from north to south but is confined to lower elevations than red spruce and the firs. It generally occupies richer and less acidic soils than the spruce and firs and is characteristic of deep, shaded and moist mountain valleys and coves. It is, unfortunately, subject to the hemlock woolly adelgid, an introduced insect, that is rapidly extirpating it as a forest tree. Less abundant, and restricted to the southern Appalachians, is Carolina hemlock. Like Canada hemlock, this tree suffers severely from the hemlock woolly adelgid.

Several species of pines characteristic of the Appalachians are eastern white pine, Virginia pine, pitch pine, Table Mountain pine and shortleaf pine. Red pine is a boreal species that forms a few high elevation outliers as far south as West Virginia. All of these species except white pine tend to occupy sandy, rocky, poor soil sites, which are mostly acidic in character. White pine, a large species valued for its timber, tends to do best in rich, moist soil, either acidic or alkaline in character. Pitch pine is also at home in acidic, boggy soil, and Table Mountain pine may occasionally be found in this habitat as well. Shortleaf pine is generally found in warmer habitats and at lower elevations than the other species. All the species listed do best in open or lightly shaded habitats, although white pine also thrives in shady coves, valleys, and on floodplains.

The Appalachians are characterized by a wealth of large, beautiful deciduous broadleaf (hardwood) trees. Their occurrences are best summarized and described in E. Lucy Braun's 1950 classic, Deciduous Forests of Eastern North America (Macmillan, New York). The most diverse and richest forests are the mixed-mesophytic or medium-moisture types, which are largely confined to rich, moist montane soils of the southern and central Appalachians, particularly in the Cumberland and Allegheny Mountains, but also thrive in the southern Appalachian coves. Characteristic canopy species are white basswood, yellow buckeye, sugar maple, American beech, tuliptree, white ash and yellow birch. Other common trees are red maple, shagbark and bitternut hickories and black or sweet birch. Small understory trees and shrubs include flowering dogwood, hophornbeam, witch-hazel and spicebush. There are also hundreds of perennial and annual herbs, among them such herbal and medicinal plants as American ginseng, goldenseal, bloodroot and black cohosh.

The foregoing trees, shrubs, and herbs are also more widely distributed in less rich mesic forests that generally occupy coves, stream valleys and flood plains throughout the southern and central Appalachians at low and intermediate elevations. In the northern Appalachians and at higher elevations of the central and southern Appalachians these diverse mesic forests give way to less diverse northern hardwood forests with canopies dominated only by American beech, sugar maple, American basswood and yellow birch and with far fewer species of shrubs and herbs.

Drier and rockier uplands and ridges are occupied by oak–chestnut forests dominated by a variety of oaks ( spp.), hickories ( spp.) and, in the past, by the American chestnut. The American chestnut was virtually eliminated as a canopy species by the introduced fungal chestnut blight, but lives on as sapling-sized sprouts that originate from roots, which are not killed by the fungus. In present-day forest canopies, chestnut has been largely replaced by oaks.

The oak forests of the southern and central Appalachians consist largely of black, northern red, white, chestnut and scarlet oaks ( and ) and hickories, such as the pignut in particular. The richest forests, which grade into mesic types, usually in coves and on gentle slopes, have dominantly white and northern red oaks, while the driest sites are dominated by chestnut oak, or sometimes by scarlet or northern red oaks. In the northern Appalachians the oaks, except for white and northern red, drop out, while the latter extends farthest north.

The oak forests generally lack the diverse small tree, shrub and herb layers of mesic forests. Shrubs are generally ericaceous, and include the evergreen mountain laurel, various species of blueberries ( spp.), black huckleberry, a number of deciduous rhododendrons (azaleas), and smaller heaths such as teaberry and trailing arbutus. The evergreen great rhododendron is characteristic of moist stream valleys. These occurrences are in line with the prevailing acidic character of most oak forest soils. In contrast, the much rarer chinquapin oak demands alkaline soils and generally grows where limestone rock is near the surface. Hence no ericaceous shrubs are associated with it.

The Appalachian flora also include a diverse assemblage of bryophytes (mosses and liverworts), as well as fungi. Some species are rare and/or endemic. As with vascular plants, these tend to be closely related to the character of the soils and the thermal environment in which they are found.

Eastern deciduous forests are subject to a number of serious insect and disease outbreaks. Among the most conspicuous is that of the introduced gypsy moth, which infests primarily oaks, causing severe defoliation and tree mortality. But it also has the benefit of eliminating weak individuals, and thus improving the genetic stock, as well as creating rich habitat of a type through accumulation of dead wood. Because hardwoods sprout so readily, this moth is not as harmful as the hemlock woolly adelgid. Perhaps more serious is the introduced beech bark disease complex, which includes both a scale insect and fungal components.

During the 19th and early 20th centuries, the Appalachian forests were subject to severe and destructive logging and land clearing, which resulted in the designation of the national forests and parks as well many state-protected areas. However, these and a variety of other destructive activities continue, albeit in diminished forms; and thus far only a few ecologically based management practices have taken hold.

Appalachian bogs are boreal ecosystems, which occur in many places in the Appalachians, particularly the Allegheny and Blue Ridge subranges. Though popularly called bogs, many of them are technically fens.

Several mountain summits in the southern Appalachians are covered with expansive open habitats (either grassy meadows or heath) known as Appalachian balds. These habitats support many unique plant and animal communities, including rare, relict species, that are adapted to the open, exposed habitat. Their origins are heavily debated; while all were formerly thought to have anthropogenic origins, more recent evidence indicates a mixed origin: many were formed by climatic conditions in the Pleistocene and kept open by Pleistocene megafauna, then by other grazing wildlife (such as bison, elk, and deer) and Native American burning practices, and finally by grazing livestock introduced by European settlers. Others, especially those dominated by introduced grasses, may be fully anthropogenic in origin. The abandonment of grazing has caused trees to encroach on many of these balds, threatening their ecosystems.
 
In contrast to the largely grazing-influenced balds of the southern Appalachians, parts of the northern Appalachians such as the White Mountains. the Adirondack Mountains, and Mount Katahdin have summits covered with true alpine tundra; these ecosystems are kept clear due to extremely harsh winter storms, and support a vegetation community more akin to that of the Arctic Circle.

Fauna

Animals that characterize the Appalachian forests include five species of tree squirrels. The most commonly seen is the low to moderate elevation eastern gray squirrel. Occupying similar habitat is the slightly larger fox squirrel and the much smaller southern flying squirrel. More characteristic of cooler northern and high elevation habitat is the red squirrel, whereas the Appalachian northern flying squirrel, which closely resembles the southern flying squirrel, is confined to northern hardwood and spruce–fir forests.

As familiar as squirrels are the eastern cottontail rabbit and the white-tailed deer. The latter in particular has greatly increased in abundance as a result of the extirpation of the eastern wolf and the North American cougar. This has led to the overgrazing and browsing of many plants of the Appalachian forests, as well as destruction of agricultural crops. Other deer include the moose, found only in the north, and the elk, which, although once extirpated, is now making a comeback, through transplantation, in the southern and central Appalachians. In Quebec, the Chic-Chocs host the only population of reindeer south of the St. Lawrence River. An additional species that is common in the north but extends its range southward at high elevations to Virginia and West Virginia is the varying or snowshoe hare. However, these central Appalachian populations are scattered and very small.

Another species of great interest is the beaver, which is showing a great resurgence in numbers after its near extirpation for its pelt. This resurgence is bringing about a drastic alteration in habitat through the construction of dams and other structures throughout the mountains.

Other common forest animals are the black bear, striped skunk, raccoon, opossum, woodchuck, bobcat, gray fox, red fox and in recent years, the coyote, another species favored by the advent of Europeans and the extirpation of eastern and red wolves. European boars were introduced in the early 20th century.

Characteristic birds of the forest are wild turkey, ruffed grouse, mourning dove, common raven, wood duck, great horned owl, barred owl, screech owl, red-tailed hawk, red-shouldered hawk, and northern goshawk, as well as a great variety of "songbirds" (Passeriformes), like the warblers in particular.

Of great importance are the many species of salamanders and, in particular, the lungless species (Family ) that live in great abundance concealed by leaves and debris, on the forest floor. Most frequently seen, however, is the eastern or red-spotted newt, whose terrestrial eft form is often encountered on the open, dry forest floor. It has been estimated that salamanders represent the largest class of animal biomass in the Appalachian forests. Frogs and toads are of lesser diversity and abundance, but the wood frog is, like the eft, commonly encountered on the dry forest floor, while a number of species of small frogs, such as spring peepers, enliven the forest with their calls. Salamanders and other amphibians contribute greatly to nutrient cycling through their consumption of small life forms on the forest floor and in aquatic habitats.

Although reptiles are less abundant and diverse than amphibians, a number of snakes are conspicuous members of the fauna. One of the largest is the non-venomous black rat snake, while the common garter snake is among the smallest but most abundant. The Eastern copperhead and the timber rattler are venomous pit vipers. The most common turtle is the eastern box turtle, which is found in both upland and lowland forests in the central and southern Appalachians. Prominent among aquatic species is the large common snapping turtle, which occurs throughout the Appalachians.

Appalachian streams are notable for their highly diverse freshwater fish life. Among the most abundant and diverse are those of the minnow family (family Cyprinidae), while species of the colorful darters ( spp.) are also abundant.

A characteristic fish of shaded, cool Appalachian forest streams is the wild brook or speckled trout, which is much sought after as a game fish.

See also
 
 Appalachia
 Appalachian League
 Appalachian Mountain Club
 Appalachian Trail
 Appalachian American

Notes

References

Sources
 Topographic maps and Geologic Folios of the United States Geological Survey

Further reading
 Brooks, Maurice (1965), The Appalachians: The Naturalist's America; illustrated by Lois Darling and Lo Brooks. Boston; Houghton Mifflin Company.
 Caudill, Harry M. (1963), Night Comes to the Cumberlands. .
 Constantz, George (2004), Hollows, Peepers, and Highlanders: an Appalachian Mountain Ecology (2nd edition). West Virginia University Press; Morgantown. 359 p.
 Olson, Ted (1998), Blue Ridge Folklife. University Press of Mississippi, 211 pages, .
 Rehder, John (2013) "Appalachian Folkways," Koxville: University of Tennessee Press.
 Chapters iii., iv. and v. of Miss E. C. Semple's American History and its Geographic Conditions (Boston, 1903).
 Weidensaul, Scott (2000), Mountains of the Heart: A Natural History of the Appalachians. Fulcrum Publishing, 288 pages, .
 Bailey Willis, The Northern Appalachians, and C. W. Hayes, The Southern Appalachians, both in National Geographic Monographs, vol. 9.

Appalachian flora and fauna-related journals
 Castanea, the journal of the Southern Appalachian Botanical Society.
 Banisteria, a journal devoted to the natural history of Virginia.
 The Journal of the Torrey Botanical Society.

External links

 Appalachian/Blue Ridge Forests images at bioimages.vanderbilt.edu (slow modem version)
 Appalachian Mixed Mesophytic Forests images at bioimages.vanderbilt.edu (slow modem version)
 University of Kentucky Appalachian Center (archived 8 May 2010)
 Forests of the Central Appalachians Project Detailed inventories of forest species at dozens of sites.

 
Appalachia
Appalachian culture
Eastern Canada
Eastern United States
Geography of Appalachia
Great Smoky Mountains National Park
Geography of the Lehigh Valley
Mountain ranges of Alabama
Mountain ranges of Canada
Mountain ranges of Georgia (U.S. state)
Mountain ranges of Kentucky
Mountain ranges of Maine
Mountain ranges of Maryland
Mountain ranges of Massachusetts
Mountain ranges of New Brunswick
Mountain ranges of New Hampshire
Mountain ranges of New Jersey
Mountain ranges of Newfoundland and Labrador
Mountain ranges of North Carolina
Mountain ranges of Nova Scotia
Mountain ranges of Pennsylvania
Mountain ranges of Quebec
Mountain ranges of South Carolina
Mountain ranges of Tennessee
Mountain ranges of the United States
Mountain ranges of Vermont
Mountain ranges of Virginia
Mountain ranges of West Virginia
Mountains of the Lehigh Valley
Physiographic divisions
Physiographic regions of Canada
Physiographic regions of the United States